A list of films produced in the United Kingdom in 1950 (see 1950 in film):

1950

See also
 1950 in British music
 1950 in British television
 1950 in the United Kingdom

References

External links
 

1950
Films
British